PRJ may refer to:

Jakarta Fair, an annual event in Indonesia
Patti Rutland Jazz, a dance company in Alabama, United States
Prantij railway station (station code PRJ), Gujarat, India
Pronair (ICAO: PRJ), a former airline based in Spain
, a file extension for the project description in a shapefile